William Sherard may refer to:

 William Sherard (1659–1728), English botanist
 William Sherard, 1st Baron Sherard (1588–1640), English courtier